The Mercyhurst Lakers, representing Mercyhurst University which is located in Erie, Pennsylvania, are composed of 24 teams in intercollegiate athletics, including men's and women's basketball, cross country, golf, ice hockey, lacrosse, rowing, soccer, tennis, and water polo. Men's sports include baseball, football, and wrestling. Women's sports include field hockey, softball, and volleyball. The Lakers compete in the NCAA Division II and are members of the Pennsylvania State Athletic Conference (PSAC) for all sports except ice hockey, which competes in NCAA Division I, bowling, which competes in East Coast Conference, men's lacrosse, which compete in Great Midwest Athletic Conference and water polo, a sport in which the NCAA holds single all-divisions national championships for men and women. The men's ice hockey team is a member of Atlantic Hockey, while the women's ice hockey team is a member of College Hockey America. The men's water polo team plays in the Collegiate Water Polo Association, and the women's water polo team plays in the Western Water Polo Association.

Teams

History
National championships
 1976: Men's tennis – NAIA
 2004: Women's rowing (team champion) – NCAA Division II
 2005: Men's rowing (4+ open) – ECAC National Champion
 2009: Josh Shields (165 lbs), wrestling – NCAA Division II
 2010: Women's rowing (8+ champion) – NCAA Division II
 2011: Men's lacrosse – NCAA Division II
 2016: Men's Lightweight Rowing: Dad Vail Champions (Lightweight 8+)
 2021: Women’s rowing: Dad Vail Champions (8+ open) 
 2021: Women’s rowing: Dad Vail Champions (4+ open) 
 2022: Women rowing: Dad Vail Champions (8+ open) 
 2022: Women’s rowing (8+ open Champion) - NCAA Division II 
 2022: Women’s rowing (4+ open Champion) - NCAA Division II 
 2022: Women’s rowing (team champion) - NCAA Division II

National finalist
 2007: Men's lacrosse – NCAA Division II
 2009: Women's ice hockey – NCAA Division I
 2009: Women's rowing – NCAA Division II
 2010: Josh Shields (165 lbs), wrestling – NCAA Division II
 2011: Women's rowing – NCAA Division II
 2013: Men's lacrosse – NCAA Division II
 2021: Women’s rowing - NCAA Division II

Mercyhurst University non-varsity sports
American Collegiate Hockey Association (ACHA) – Division I
 Men's ice hockey (College Hockey Mid-America)

References

External links